Eygliers is a commune in the Hautes-Alpes department in southeastern France.

Population

Geography
The river Guil forms all of the commune's southeastern and southern borders; the Durance forms part of its western border; most of the human settlements in the commune are located in its southwestern part, near the confluence of the two rivers.

See also
Communes of the Hautes-Alpes department

References

Communes of Hautes-Alpes
Dauphiné